A credit union league or credit union central is cooperative federation for credit unions.

Canada 
In Canada there is generally one credit union central per province (with exceptions).  Except for the Desjardins Group (primarily operating in Quebec, but also French-speaking areas of New Brunswick and Ontario) which is separate, they are all members the Canadian Credit Union Association, the national trade association for credit unions.  The Canadian Central is itself a member of the Canadian Co-operative Association, while Desjardins is a member of the Conseil canadien de la coopération et de la mutualité.

United States 
In the United States a credit union league is a state-level trade association for credit unions, which are not-for-profit financial cooperatives.  Credit union leagues hold a primary interest in the Credit Union National Association (CUNA).

Many credit union leagues were formed through the efforts of the Credit Union National Extension Bureau in the 1920s. In 1934, Congress enacted the Federal Credit Union Act and the CUNA was formed.
The term "league" was employed to denote a mutually supportive organization for the promotion and success of credit unions. Each state in the United States, as well as Washington, D.C., Puerto Rico and Guam, had its own League.  State leagues also designed the corporate credit union model, to serve as the "credit union's credit union" by providing financial services independent of the commercial banking industry. 

From the 1930s until the 1970s, one of the chief duties of the League system was to promote and help facilitate the chartering of new credit unions.  However, increased regulation and higher capitalization requirements, combined with the decline in American manufacturing job creation, virtually ended the formation of new credit unions except in special circumstances.

Leagues also operate for profit "services corporations" which provide services (credit card processing, commercial printing, ATM networks, shared service centers, etc.) to credit unions and to other state leagues.  

Consolidation of statewide Leagues began in the late 1980s and accelerated in the 1990s.  Also in the 1990s, a move to modernize the names of Leagues also began to happen.  In Ohio, for example, the organization became known as the Ohio Credit Union System, with the Ohio Credit Union League becoming just one of four components of the system umbrella.

Leagues also perform the function of lobbying state legislatures for laws that are beneficial to credit unions through the registered lobbyists.

References

See also
 Corporate credit union
 Credit union service organization